Coup de chapeau au passé is the 29th full-length release by French singer Dalida.  It was released in 1976, and produced by her brother, Bruno "Orlando" Gigliotti.

Track listing
"La mer" (Charles Trenet)
"La vie en Rose" (Edith Piaf, Louiguy)
"Maman" (Bixio Cherubini, Cesare Bixio, Geo Koger)
"Parle-moi d'amour, Mon Amour (Le Chaland qui Passe)" (Cesare Bixio, Claude Carmone, Pascal Sevran)
"Que Reste-t-il de Nos Amours?" (Version 1972) (Trenet)
"Besame mucho (Embrasse-moi)" (Consuelo Velasquez, Serge Lebrail, Sevran)
"Les Feuilles Mortes" (Jacques Prevert, Joseph Kosma)
"J'attendrai" (Dino Olivieri, Louis Poterat, Nino Rastelli)
"Le petit bonheur" (Felix Leclerc)
"Amor Amor" (Amour c'est tout dire) (Sevran, Lebrail)
"Tico Tico" (Jacques LaRue, Zequinha Abreu)

Bonus (version 1980)
 Tu M'as Déclaré L'amour

Singles
1976 J'attendrai
1976 Parle-moi d'amour mon amour
1976 Le petit bonheur

See also
 Dalida
 List of Dalida songs
 Dalida albums discography
 Dalida singles discography

References

Sources 
 Dalida Official Website

External links
 Dalida Official Website "Discography" section

Dalida albums
1976 albums